North Bastion usually refers to a bastion at the north of a fortification.  It may be used for:
North Bastion, Gibraltar, a bastion at the northwest corner of the old town of Gibraltar
North Bastion Mountain, a mountain in British Columbia, Canada named after the north bastion of the Tower of London